Indian women's national volleyball team represents India in international competitions and is managed by the Volleyball Federation of India.

In July 2018, Minimol Abraham was appointed as the captain of the Indian national team for the 2018 Asian Games.

The team won the gold medal at the 2019 South Asian Games as they defeated Nepal in the final.

Tournament record

Summer Olympics
Similar to their male counterparts, the Indian women's team has never qualified for the summer Olympics.

FIVB World Championship
India has qualified only once in the World Championship.

Asian Volleyball Championship

Asian Games

Notable players
Minimol Abraham
Aswani Kiran
Priyanka Bora
Priyanka Khedkar
Nirmal Saini
Jagmati Sangwan
Soorya Thottangal

See also

 India men's national volleyball team
 India women's national under-20 volleyball team
 India women's national under-18 volleyball team

References

Volleyball in India
Volley
National women's volleyball teams
Women's volleyball in India